The 2019–20 Udinese Calcio season was the club's 40th season in Serie A and their 25th consecutive season in the top-flight. The club competed in Serie A and the Coppa Italia.

Former Juventus player Igor Tudor, rehired as coach in March 2019 following the sacking of Davide Nicola, remained as manager into the 2019–20 season.

Players

Squad information
Last updated on 9 February 2020
Appearances include league matches only

Transfers

In

Loans in

Out

Loans out

Pre-season and friendlies

Competitions

Serie A

League table

Results summary

Results by round

Matches

Coppa Italia

Statistics

Appearances and goals

|-
! colspan=14 style=background:#dcdcdc; text-align:center| Goalkeepers

|-
! colspan=14 style=background:#dcdcdc; text-align:center| Defenders

|-
! colspan=14 style=background:#dcdcdc; text-align:center| Midfielders

|-
! colspan=14 style=background:#dcdcdc; text-align:center| Forwards

|-
! colspan=14 style=background:#dcdcdc; text-align:center| Players transferred out during the season

Goalscorers

Last updated: 9 February 2020

Clean sheets

Last updated: 9 February 2020

Disciplinary record

Last updated: 9 February 2020

References

Udinese Calcio seasons
Udinese